Vladislav Romanov (born 7 February 1988 in Sofia) is a Bulgarian retired footballer

Career
Romanov is a product of CSKA Sofia's Academy having joined the club at the age of 7. He was a part of the side that won the 2007 Bulgarian Under-19 Championship, beating Levski Sofia on penalties in the final. Romanov scored the final penalty to give CSKA the victory.

In January 2008, after a short trial period, Romanov joined Lokomotiv Mezdra. On 12 November 2008, he made his professional debut in a Bulgarian Cup match against Balkan Botevgrad, replacing Rui Miguel at half time.

In July 2009, Romanov signed with newly promoted B Group side Botev Vratsa.

On 9 June 2010, Romanov signed with Lokomotiv Sofia on a four-year deal. He made his A Group debut in a 1–0 away win over Montana on 1 August. Romanov scored his first goal two weeks later, netting the fourth in a 4–0 home win against Kaliakra Kavarna.

On 10 January 2017, Romanov signed with Neftochimic Burgas. He left the club after 6 months, following the relegation to Second League.

On 14 June 2017, Romanov joined Septemvri Sofia. He made his debut for the team on 17 July 2017 in match against Dunav Ruse. He was released from the team on 21 December 2017.

Career statistics

References

External links

Profile at Sportal.bg

1988 births
Living people
Bulgarian footballers
First Professional Football League (Bulgaria) players
PFC Lokomotiv Mezdra players
FC Botev Vratsa players
FC Lokomotiv 1929 Sofia players
PFC Slavia Sofia players
MKS Cracovia (football) players
FC Lyubimets players
PFC Cherno More Varna players
Neftochimic Burgas players
FC Septemvri Sofia players
Bulgarian expatriate footballers
Expatriate footballers in Poland
Bulgarian expatriate sportspeople in Poland
Association football midfielders